Gua Musang may refer to:
 Gua Musang District
 Gua Musang (federal constituency)